Aljunied is a sub-urban area located in the central part of the city-state of Singapore. Named after Aljunied Road, it was formerly agricultural land which has since been heavily urbanised and presently comprises a variety of land uses. Today, Aljunied is a bustling neighbourhood with HDB flats with amenities like shops, schools, parks and recreational facilities, as well as quite a number of traditional Singaporean shophouses.

Etymology
Aljunied Road was officially named in 1926 after Syed Sharif Omar bin Ali Al Junied (died 1852), who owned large tracts of agricultural land in the area.

Syed Sharif Omar bin Ali Al Junied was a wealthy Hadhrami Arab merchant from Palembang, where he had set up business after migrating from his hometown in Tarim, Yemen. He was also a highly respected man, looked upon by the Malays as a prince. Syed Omar came from the well-respected Arab family who were descendants of Islamic prophet Muhammad. He was a nephew of Syed Mohammed bin Harun Al Junied, who also came from Palembang to Singapore before the founding of modern Singapore in 1819.

Syed Omar was a philanthropist and his charitable acts included donating what is now called Jalan Kubor Cemetery, a large plot of land in Victoria Street for the purposes of a Muslim burial ground, the construction of a mosque in Bencoolen Street and Masjid Kampong Melaka, renamed Masjid Omar Kampong Melaka in his honour. The land where St Andrew's Cathedral stands was also donated by him. He and his family contributed largely to the setting up of the Tan Tock Seng Hospital. Syed Omar's descendants continue to reside in Singapore.

In 1927, one of his descendants, Syed Abdul Rahman Aljunied, built the Madrasah Aljunied Al-Islamiah on a vacant ground next to Jalan Kubor Cemetery in commemoration of his grandfather, Syed Omar.  Madrasah Aljunied was a leading Islamic religious school which produced many religious leaders of Southeast Asian countries.

Education

Kindergarten 
 St Magdalene's Kindergarten

Primary schools
 Canossa Catholic Primary School
 Geylang Methodist School (primary)
 CHIJ Our Lady of Good Counsel

Secondary schools
 Geylang Methodist Secondary School

Special schools
 Canossian School

Former schools 

 MacPherson Secondary School

Politics

Aljunied formerly falls under Aljunied Constituency from 1959 to 1988. In 1968, the MacPherson area of Aljunied was under MacPherson Constituency and in 1988, renamed as MacPherson Single Member Constituency (SMC). In 1988, both wards were merged into Aljunied Group Representation Constituency (GRC).

In 1991, the Macpherson area went under Marine Parade GRC and then became its own individual constituency again as MacPherson Single Member Constituency (SMC) again in 1997. In 2001, the Macpherson area was merged back into Marine Parade GRC again and split back as MacPherson SMC again in 2015.

See also
Aljunied MRT station
Geylang East Public Library
Buddhist Library (Singapore)
Foo Hai Ch'an Monastery

References

Victor R Savage, Brenda S A Yeoh (2003), Toponymics - A Study of Singapore Street Names, Eastern Universities Press, 
Syed Sharif Omar al-Junied 
Madrasah Aljunied al-Islamiah
Masjid Omar Kampong Melaka

 
Places in Singapore
Geylang